"We Got a Love Thang" is a song by American singer-songwriter CeCe Peniston, originally released in January 1992 as the second single from her debut album, Finally (1992). The song was co-written by Chantay Savage, and became the second number one hit for the artist, remaining on the top of the Billboard Hot Dance Music/Club Play chart for two weeks. In the United Kingdom, the title scored number six, while on the Billboard Hot 100, it reached number twenty. The song contains a sample of the drum break from "Rock with You" by Michael Jackson.

Critical reception
Larry Flick of Billboard wrote, "Duplicating the magic of the now-classic club anthem "Finally" was a seemingly impossible task. However, with the aid of producer Steve "Silk" Hurley, Peniston has come pretty darn close on this delicious pop/houser, on which she exudes immeasurable charm and the sass of a diva." A reviewer from Cash Box described the song as an "uptempo, club-oriented song that resembles her previous single, but still has a sound of its own." 

Matthew Cole from Music Weeks RM Dance Update felt that it sees her "sunshine vocals" given the Steve "Silk" Hurley treatment, adding, "The result is sheer smoothness. The song has none of "Finally"'s irresistible cutesy charm, but CeCe's vocal once more refines everything that makes you want to dance." Stuart Maconie from New Musical Express found that "this has aspirations to being a very good record, chiefly by virtue of a brilliantly cheesy tooting (technical term) horn sound and crappy Bontempi organ doodlings."

Retrospective response
In an 2017 retrospective review, Steven E. Flemming Jr. of Albumism stated that the song "skillfully melded the insistent grace of all that’s right about dance production values with grand vocals." AllMusic editor Craig Lytle remarked that "We Got a Love Thang," like "Finally", "employ that rapid dancehall groove better known as house music." In an 2014 review, Pop Rescue viewed it as "perfectly up-beat."

Credits and personnel
 Management
 Executive producers – Manny Lehman, Mark Mazzetti
 Recording studio – Tanglewood Studios, Chicago, Illinois 
 Publishing – Last Song
 Administration – Third Coast Music (ASCAP)

 Production
 Writers – Eric Miller, Jeremiah McAllister, Chantay Savage 
 Producers – Steven Hurley ; Miller  and Maurice Joshua (remix)
 Mixing and arrangement – Hurley
 Remixing – Hurley, Miller, Joshua (also edits)
 Engineering – Larry Sturm; Hurley and Miller (remix)

 Personnel
 Vocals – Cecilia Peniston
 Backing vocals – Savage, Kimberly Russell , Donell Rush 
 Keyboards – Hurley and McAllister  (remix)
 Drum programming – Hurley (remix)
 Cover art – Simon Fowler, Peggy Sirota
 Design – Sarah Southin, Len Peltier

Track listings and formats

 VHS, US, Promo, #() "We Got a Love Thang" (Hurley's Silky 7") - 4:30

 7", US, #75021 1594 7 "We Got a Love Thang" (Hurley's Silky 7") - 4:30
 "Finally" (LP Version) - 4:03

 7", US, #AM-8720 "We Got a Love Thang" (LP Version) -  	5:27
 "Finally" (7" Mix) - 4:30

 7", DE, #AM 846/390 846-7 7", EU & UK, #AM 846/390 846-7 CD, FR, #390 702-2 "We Got a Love Thang" (Silky 7") - 3:45
 "We Got a Love Thang" (LP Edit) - 3:49

 CS, NL, #300179-4 CS, US, #75021 1594 4 "We Got a Love Thang" (Silky 7") - 3:45
 "We Got a Love Thang" (LP Version) -  	5:27

 CD, AU, #390 680-2 "We Got a Love Thang" (Silky House Thang) - 6:58
 "We Got a Love Thang" (LP Edit) - 3:49

 MCD, DE, #AMCD 846/390 846-2 MCD, EU & UK, #AMCD 846/390 846-2 "We Got a Love Thang" (Silky 7") - 3:45
 "We Got a Love Thang" (Silky House Thang) - 6:58
 "We Got a Love Thang" (E-Smoove Groovy Mix) - 6:25
 "We Got a Love Thang" (LP Edit) - 3:49

 12", US, #75021 2395 1 MCD, US, #75021 2395 2 "We Got a Love Thang" (Silky House Thang) - 6:58
 "We Got a Love Thang" (Silky Dub Thang) - 4:23
 "We Got a Love Thang" (Hurley's Silky 7") - 4:30
 "We Got a Love Thang" (Maurice 12") - 7:14
 "We Got a Love Thang" (E-Smoove Groovy Mix) - 6:25
 "We Got a Love Thang" (LP Version) - 5:27

 12", NL, #390 846-1 12", UK, #AMY 846/390 846-1 12", UK, Promo, #AMYDJ 846/390 846-1 "We Got a Love Thang" (Silky House Thang) - 6:58
 "We Got a Love Thang" (E-Smoove Groovy Mix) - 6:25
 "We Got a Love Thang" (Maurice 12") - 7:14
 "We Got a Love Thang" (Silky 7") - 3:45
 "We Got a Love Thang" (LP Edit) - 3:49
 "We Got a Love Thang" (Silky Dub Thang) - 4:23
 "We Got a Love Thang" (E-Smoove Dub) - 6:37

 12", US, Double, Promo, #75021 7328 1 "We Got a Love Thang" (Silky House Thang) - 6:58
 "We Got a Love Thang" (Silky Dub Thang) - 4:23
 "We Got a Love Thang" (Hurley's Silky 7") - 4:30
 "We Got a Love Thang" (LP Version) - 5:27
 "We Got a Love Thang" (Maurice 12") - 7:14
 "We Got a Love Thang" (Maurice's Dub) - 7:17
 "We Got a Love Thang" (E-Smoove Groovy Mix) - 6:25
 "We Got a Love Thang" (E-Smoove Dub) - 6:37

 MCD, US, Promo, #75021 7330 2'''
 "We Got a Love Thang" (Hurley's Silky 7") - 4:30
 "We Got a Love Thang" (LP Edit II) - 4:11
 "We Got a Love Thang" (Maurice's 7") - 4:32
 "We Got a Love Thang" (LP Version) - 5:27
 "We Got a Love Thang" (Silky House Thang) - 6:58
 "We Got a Love Thang" (Maurice 12") - 7:14
 "We Got a Love Thang" (E-Smoove Groovy Mix) - 6:25
 "We Got a Love Thang" (Silky Dub Thang) - 4:23
 "We Got a Love Thang" (Maurice's Dub) - 7:17
 "We Got a Love Thang" (E-Smoove Dub) - 6:37

Charts

Weekly charts

Year-end charts

See also
 List of number-one dance singles of 1992 (U.S.)
 List of top 10 singles in 1992 (UK)
 The Best Dance Album in the World... Ever! Now That's What I Call Music! 21''

References

General

 Specific

External links
 

1992 singles
1997 singles
CeCe Peniston songs
Songs written by Eric Miller (musician)
1992 songs
A&M Records singles
Polydor Records singles
Songs written by Chantay Savage